Stars' Top Recipe at Fun-Staurant is a South Korean television program that airs on KBS2. It currently airs every Friday at 20:30 (KST). The program is also available to watch on KBS World's YouTube channel from November 5, 2019.

The program is notable for popularizing the Macanese coffee beverage later known as "Dalgona coffee" by former cast member Jung Il-woo.

Overview
Based on a theme, celebrities will develop and reveal their own creative recipes, plus cooking personally. They will also share various cooking tips and other related helping points. The competing dishes (that should be convenience store-friendly) are then judged by a judge squad, and the winning dish will be available in CU outlets around South Korea the next day after the announcement of the winning dish. In addition, the winning dishes, beginning Round 17, are also available in online markets, in the form of a meal kit.

On May 2, 2022, it was announced that the show has signed a partnership with GS25. The winning dishes, beginning Round 41, will be available in GS25 outlets, instead of CU outlets. Each winning dish would also be known as the "Meal of the Month".

Proceeds from the sales of the winning dishes will be donated to charities. The amount of sales has totaled up to more than ₩364,201,970, as reported on episode 153.

Judge Squad
From the show's premiere to Round 13, the celebrities' dishes were judged by a judge squad. The judge squad consisted of chefs  and Lee Won-il, singer Lee Seung-chul and Kim Jung-hoon, the MD of CU. They will judge the dishes based on these categories: Taste, Texture, Originality, and Marketability. Lee Won-il has not appeared after Round 9, possibly due to the effects of the media reports accusing his wife Kim Yoo-jin of bullying behaviour in the past.

From Rounds 14 to 16, the judge squad consisted of 20 individuals (5 each from the 10s, the 20s, the 30s-40s and the 50s-60s). The 20 individuals could include idol singers or the sons/daughters of celebrities. The judge squad also include the guest host(s) of the round and chef Lee Yeon-bok. The judging criteria remains the same. Due to this change, Lee Seung-chul and Kim Jung-hoon have no longer appeared on the show from Round 14.

From Rounds 17 to 40, the judge squad consisted of only chefs, including Lee Yeon-bok as the head judge. Lee Won-il reappeared as part of the Judge Squad alongside Lee Yeon-bok from Round 33 to Round 40.

From Round 41, a professional judge squad consisting of Lee Yeon-bok and various experts, and a special judge squad would decide in the winning dish. The judge squads would taste the competing dishes without knowing who cooked them.

Cast

Host

Fixed Judge Squad
Other than being part of the judge squad to judge the food, they will sit together with the guest host(s) and the cast lineup to watch the recorded clips of the celebrities preparing their creative recipes.

Current

Former

Special Judge Squad

Episodes (2019)

 Notes:
 No broadcast on December 27 due to the broadcast of 2019 KBS Song Festival.

Episodes (2020)

 Notes:
 No broadcast on November 20 due to the live broadcast of the 2020 KBO League's 2020 Korean Series.
 No broadcast on December 18 due to the live broadcast of the 2020 KBS Song Festival.

Episodes (2021)

 Notes:
 No broadcast on November 26 due to the live broadcast of the 42nd Blue Dragon Film Awards.
 No broadcast on December 17 due to the live broadcast of the 2021 KBS Song Festival.
 No broadcast on December 31 due to the live broadcast of the 2021 KBS Drama Awards.

Episodes (2022)

 Notes:
 No broadcast on February 11 due to the live broadcast of the 2022 Winter Olympics.
 No broadcast on October 14, and a special broadcast was aired, featuring Ryu Soo-young in Rounds 45 and 48, Lee Chan-won in Round 46, and Cha Ye-ryun in Round 45.
 No broadcast on November 25 due to the live broadcast of the 43rd Blue Dragon Film Awards.
 No broadcast on December 16 due to the broadcast of 2022 KBS Song Festival.

Episodes (2023)

 Notes:
 No broadcast on March 10 due to the live broadcast of the 2023 World Baseball Classic.

Winning tally

Ratings
 Ratings listed below are the individual corner ratings of Stars' Top Recipe at Fun-Staurant. (Note: Individual corner ratings do not include commercial time, which regular ratings include.)

2019

2020

2021

2022

2023

Awards and nominations

Notes

References

External links
  
 

Korean Broadcasting System
South Korean variety television shows
South Korean television shows
Korean-language television shows
2019 South Korean television series debuts
South Korean cooking television series